Auletobius humeralis is a species of leaf or bud weevil in the family Attelabidae. It is found in North America.

References

Further reading

 
 
 
 
 
 

Attelabidae
Beetles described in 1859